Onslaught is a fictional character appearing in American comic books published by Marvel Comics.

Onslaught was written as a sentient psionic entity created from the consciousness of two mutants: Professor Charles Xavier and Magneto. During a battle between the X-Men and Magneto's Acolytes, Professor Xavier used his telepathic powers to shut down Magneto's mind, rendering him catatonic. It was explained through the Onslaught crossover series that the darkest aspect of Magneto's mind escaped into Xavier's subconscious, where it "merged" with Xavier's own darker nature to eventually grow into a separate persona of its own.

Publication history
The character first appeared in cameo in X-Men: Prime #1 (July 1995), named in Uncanny X-Men #322 and made his first full appearance in X-Men vol. 1, #53 (June 1996) where he was co-created by writers Scott Lobdell, Mark Waid, and artist Andy Kubert. He was written and introduced as a villain that was part of the effect of events in the 1993 "Fatal Attractions" storyline. Onslaught's introduction into X-Men storylines caused its own crossover event across multiple Marvel comic book titles (including X-Men and Uncanny X-Men issues, and Cable issues).

Fictional character biography

Origins
Onslaught is a sentient psionic entity created from the consciousness of Professor Charles Xavier and Magneto. During a battle between the X-Men and Magneto's Acolytes, Magneto used his powers to rip the adamantium from Wolverine's skeleton, causing such extensive injuries that his healing factor was exhausted. Xavier was so unhinged with anger over the brutality of Magneto's assault against Wolverine that he used his telepathic powers to shut down Magneto's mind and render him catatonic. During the psionic contact, Magneto's anger, grief, and lust for vengeance entered Xavier's consciousness, mingling with every long-suppressed negative feeling Xavier had endured during the last 30 years. This result created the being known as Onslaught.

First appearance
Onslaught remained dormant for some time but subtly began influencing Charles Xavier. After an attempt to spy on the new mutant Nate Grey, a refugee from the world known as the "Age of Apocalypse", resulted in the latter pulling Xavier from the astral plane into the real world, the aspect of Onslaught in Xavier was able to use this experience to 'teach' itself how to manifest its own body.

Onslaught offers Juggernaut a chance to join him in his effort to generate fear in a twisted plot to "unify" humans and mutants. When Marko declines his offer and decides to warn the X-Men of the danger ahead, Onslaught uses his powers to mentally block Juggernaut from remembering its true identity, and magnetically to fling him from Vancouver to New Jersey. When the X-Men find him, Cain was only able to tell the X-Men one word, the name of his attacker: "Onslaught".

Following the encounter with Juggernaut, Onslaught invaded a government-sanctioned Sentinel base. He downloaded the current specifications for the mutant-hunting androids and erased portions of the memories of the employees working in the clandestine factory. Additionally, Onslaught had started recruiting others to do his dirty work for him and first manifested himself to the X-Men when he challenged the teleporter Gateway to test Cyclops, Storm, Wolverine, and Iceman, by kidnapping them and sending them to face off against his agent Post. Later, Onslaught helped Jean Grey and Gambit escape from a secret meeting held at the Pentagon, where Bastion, the leader of Operation Zero Tolerance, met with various world leaders to discuss the threat of mutants.

Onslaught’s attention was also occupied by another task; the recruitment of the immensely powerful telepath Nate Grey. To do the job, the powerful entity knocked out Sebastian Shaw and Tessa, to lure Holocaust away from them, promising him immeasurable power in exchange for his loyalty. He then dispatched Holocaust to test Nate. Using physical force, Nate  eventually cracked Holocaust’s armor, though he was unable to breach the powerful psionic defenses Onslaught placed around Holocaust’s mind. Accepting defeat, Holocaust fled, but warned Nate that Onslaught knew his potential now and would come in person to claim him.

Onslaught later sought out Jean Grey, hoping to convince her to join his cause with the offer of power rivaling that of the Phoenix Force. He took her into the astral plane where he revealed damaging information about Professor Xavier, such as a long-forgotten attraction the Professor had to Jean during the X-Men's early days in hoping to recruit her Phoenix Force experience to gain more power. Jean resisted Onslaught, but he defeated her and sent her back to her physical body with only a fleeting memory of what had happened as well as the name "Onslaught" telepathically branded on her forehead.

Gradually, Xavier's frustration with his dream of mutant-human harmony began to increase, exacerbated by the daily growth of anti-mutant hysteria, the deaths of dozens of mutants from the lethal Legacy Virus, and his own failed attempt to rehabilitate Sabretooth. Xavier reached his breaking point when anti-mutant humans killed a young mutant near the grounds of the Xavier Institute for Higher Learning, the secret base of the X-Men. At this point, Onslaught awakened within Xavier and took full possession of the Professor's mind and body. Onslaught-as-Xavier called together the X-Men. When they resisted his plan to turn them into soldiers fighting a total war against humans, Onslaught revealed himself to the X-Men and tried to destroy them. Bishop, remembering childhood stories of a traitor betraying and killing the X-Men, began to realize that the guilty party was Xavier as Onslaught. Bishop rescued his teammates, but Onslaught escaped, taking Xavier's body with him.

Once free, Onslaught created a childlike psionic projection named Charles to gain the trust of Franklin Richards. Onslaught captured the child, despite a rescue attempt by Mister Fantastic and the Invisible Woman. Now carrying Franklin and Xavier, Onslaught also captured Nate Grey, intending to use his raw psionic power to fuel Onslaught’s plans to transform the human race into a collective consciousness. Onslaught returned to New York, reprogramming the Sentinel robots to obey his commands and form a protective circle around Manhattan, sealing off the island from the rest of the world.

The X-Men, the Fantastic Four, and the Avengers joined forces to challenge Onslaught. Their first confrontation with the entity and his minions resulted in the rescue of Xavier, reducing Onslaught to a mass of psionic energy contained within his armor. Unfortunately, this also prevented Xavier from influencing the villain with his better nature. A second and final confrontation occurred at Onslaught's Central Park citadel where the heroes made a number of attempts to free Franklin and X-Man from Onslaught's armor. During their next assault, Jean Grey used her telepathy to suppress the part of the monstrous Hulk's mind that contained the rationality of his alter ego, Dr. Bruce Banner. With his new, nearly-feral intelligence pushing his rage - and thus, his strength - to unbelievable levels, the Hulk battled Onslaught and tore apart his armor. The resulting explosion of psionic energy separated Banner and the Hulk, and Onslaught was left as an energy being, immune to most physical harm. Onslaught then used Franklin's powers to create a second sun that would destroy the heroes and Manhattan. In desperation, Thor flew into the energy being, disrupting Onslaught's form. Realizing that Thor's efforts alone were insufficient to destroy their adversary, the non-mutant members of the Avengers and the Fantastic Four entered the energy field. The X-Men were unable to do likewise, as it was theorized that if Onslaught, a being of mutant origin, came to possess a mutant host, he would become unstoppable. Onslaught dissolved, seemingly destroyed, along with the heroes who had thrown themselves into the rift.

The remaining Sentinels were disabled, Franklin and Nate were rescued, and Manhattan was returned to normal. Later, it was revealed that the Avengers and the Fantastic Four did not die, as had been surmised. Rather, the heroes were reborn in a pocket universe created by Franklin. The Avengers and the Fantastic Four returned to their rightful home months later, possessing only hazy memories of their time on Counter-Earth.

Onslaught Reborn

A five-issue limited series was issued in late 2006 to celebrate the tenth anniversary of the "Onslaught" storyline, titled Onslaught Reborn, by writer Jeph Loeb and artist Rob Liefeld. Onslaught Reborn features the return of the villain and addresses unresolved plot threads; this event is set after the "Decimation" and "Civil War" storylines.

After Scarlet Witch used her powers to de-power most of Earth's mutants, the powers of Charles Xavier and Magneto collided to reform Onslaught, whose consciousness lingered after his defeat. Onslaught swore revenge on the young Franklin Richards and any other hero that he despised, manifesting as a monstrous version of his previous form with a skull-like face. He first took control of both the Human Torch and Mr. Fantastic in an attempt to kill Franklin, but was soon interrupted by the Invisible Woman and the Thing, who saved Franklin. Franklin ran to Counter-Earth, but Onslaught followed.

As Onslaught appeared in Counter-Earth he became larger, and regained his Magneto-like mask. He soon encountered the Avengers and was presumed defeated after he fell into the ocean. Instead of worrying about Onslaught, the Avengers questioned Franklin's credibility, as Franklin claimed to be the son of both Mr. Fantastic and the Invisible Woman. On Counter-Earth Mr. Fantastic and the Invisible Woman were not married and did not have children. Shortly after this, Thor was assaulted by an Onslaught-possessed Hulk, who battled Thor to determine which of the two was more powerful. Onslaught switched between the bodies and possessed Thor, who struck the Hulk with lightning. As Thor was about to strike again, he dropped his hammer, as Onslaught was not worthy to carry it. Onslaught switched back to the Hulk, and punched Thor into the atmosphere. Onslaught was assaulted by the Avengers before he could pick up Thor's hammer. Captain America ordered the Human Torch and Iron Man to rescue Thor, telling them they had about sixty seconds for the rescue. They raced to save him, and Johnny took Thor back to the Baxter Building, where Mr. Fantastic discovered that Franklin really was his son. In the battle, Captain America ordered Hawkeye to find Onslaught, and confronted Hawkeye with the fact that Wolverine was hiding in Hawkeye's costume. The Avengers continued to battle the Hulk, while Captain America was thrown into a building. Iron Man, from the atmosphere, charged down at the Hulk at full speed, hoping that Bruce would forgive him someday. He punched the Hulk, knocking him out. He and Captain America assessed their next move until Onslaught possessed Iron Man and attacked Captain America. Back at Avengers Mansion, Rikki Barnes was babysitting Franklin when Loki, Executioner, Scarlet Witch, Enchantress, and Ultron V surprised them with an offer to help defeat Onslaught. On a balcony, an invisible Ant-Man and the Invisible Woman let themselves be known, as Sue refused to let the villains cause Franklin any harm.

After a brief skirmish, the heroes and villains decided to work together to defeat Onslaught. Rikki "Bucky" Barnes defeated Onslaught using a Fantasticar to send both Barnes and Onslaught through the Negative Zone barrier in the Fantastic Four's lab, trapping them. Franklin returned home, Bucky found herself on Earth 616, and Onslaught was last seen floating outside the Area 42 Prison in the Negative Zone.

Onslaught Unleashed
Some time later, Rikki Barnes, now known as Nomad, began having strange and vivid nightmare about the deep jungles of South America. When her teammate Toro is kidnapped just like she dreamed, she begins to suspect that her nightmares are something more sinister than she first thought. Later, while investigating Corporate Conglomerate Roxxon for illegal weapons systems, the Secret Avengers come across the plans for Project Power, a new and incredibly deadly power source being secretly developed in the Colombian rainforest. As the Secret Avengers investigate the facility, Beast and Ant-Man find the source of the mysterious energy source to be from the Negative Zone. As Rikki races inside the facility to locate Toro, she stumbles into the control room instead, where the sinister voice of her dreams beckons and reveals itself to be Onslaught.

Possessing Rikki's body, Onslaught reveals that the real Rikki had, in fact, died in the Negative Zone; his current host was just a construct made by Onslaught himself so he could use the energy he had stored in her as an anchor to pull himself back into the main Marvel Earth. The revelation that Rikki had been sent to the main Marvel Earth solely to serve as Onslaught's tether forced Rikki to fight back to prove he was wrong. Eventually, Rikki had Gravity kill her so that Onslaught could not return and destroy Earth.

Despite Rikki's apparent death, Steve Rogers began to have nightmares similar to the ones Rikki had before, suggesting that enough of Nomad's (and Onslaught's) energy may have survived to escape death and now seek a new way to return to the main Marvel reality.

Red Onslaught
A clone of Red Skull later exhumes Charles Xavier's corpse and grafts part of his brain onto his own, giving him Xavier's psychic abilities.

In the lead-up to the AXIS storyline, Magneto is pushed too far by the Red Skull and his S-Men, after discovering that the madman had turned Genosha into a Concentration Camp and was exterminating mutants and inhumans. Filled with anger, Magneto killed the S-Men before killing the Red Skull, offering him a "clean death". Rather than using his own magnetic powers, Erik used bricks to shatter the villain's skull, however by murdering the Red Skull, he merely unleashed Onslaught, who had apparently been dormant within Xavier's mind, causing the psionic being to merge with the Red Skull and become Red Onslaught, by far the most powerful incarnation of Red Skull. He then started telepathically spreading hate across the world, as Magneto and the Avengers Unity Division tried to stop him. The Avengers came to help after locating the Skull following the discovery he was the source of the "World War Hate", who were shortly after joined by the X-Men and other allies. However, the Red Onslaught deployed two Adamantium Stark Sentinels which had been created by Iron Man under the influence of the Skull's telepathy, with their creation having been wiped from his memories by the villain. Red Onslaught is eventually defeated by the combined might of Scarlet Witch and Doctor Doom, that tried using their magic to perform a moral inversion on him that would allow Professor X to control the amalgamation, but their efforts backfire, causing all the heroes and villains present during the confrontation to morally invert from their usual behavior. With the Skull now reverted to a human body that is identified as the 'White Skull' — implied more than once to be Professor Xavier in control of the body once again — he is hidden from the inverted Avengers by Edwin Jarvis until the aged Steve Rogers can retrieve him. Working with the inverted villains — now referring to themselves as the 'Astonishing Avengers' — and with the resurrected Brother Voodoo now possessing the inverted Scarlet Witch, the White Skull is able to undo the inversion, although he simply returns to his Red Skull persona rather than Onslaught.

Powers of X
With the secret aid of Moira MacTaggert (who's revealed not only alive but actually a mutant herself with the power of reincarnation), Charles Xavier and Magneto created a mutant nation on Krakoa. Moira noted on her journal that her actions in manipulating Xavier had broken his psyche and she feared this would eventually unleash something unexpected on the world. Moira's fears were fulfilled when Xavier launched the psychic attack upon Magneto years later which created Onslaught.

Reign of X
Following the creation of Krakoa as a mutant nation, Nightcrawler becomes aware that a dark presence is haunting Krakoa, radically altering and influencing the minds of the young mutants and pushing them to their darker and crueler impulses on a day-to-day basis, especially in light of effective immortality. This boogieman is a mysterious figure that appears and hunts the mutants in their dreams. The youths named him the Patchwork Man and even tell campfire ghost stories of him. Believing the culprit to be his son Legion, Xavier recruits Nightcrawler to investigate and bring Legion to Krakoa. Nightcrawler eventually finds and rescues Legion from Project Orchis with the later confirming to Nightcrawler that the Patchwork Man is none other than Onslaught, somehow restored and weaponized by Project Orchis, the secret alliance of anti-mutant scientists and politicians, in the hopes that his influence would push mutantkind into destroying themselves.

Onslaught's return was kept a secret by Nightcrawler and Legion, out of fear of how it would lash out to protect itself if exposed. Working with Kuan-Yin Xorn and Shen Xorn, Legion tried to set a trap for the psychic entity by merging the minds of Loa and Mercury to entice him to invade. He was able to escape and caused a fight between Fabian Cortez and Lost at Stacy X's orphanage and later possessed every mutant in the Green Lagoon during a meeting between Legion and his father, forcing David and the Xorn brothers to kill everyone there in order to free them from his control. Legion eventually deduced that as the Patchwork Man, Onslaught had been feeding on the parts of the mutants psyches that were lost during resurrection, and implanting a part of himself into the mind of every resurrected mutant.

Onslaught Revelation
Its eventually discovered that Project Orchis implanted a sliver of Onslaught's on Lost, who they had used as a test subject before. When Lost was revived, the piece of Onslaught implanted itself on every mutant on the island. Thankfully, Onslaught was discovered before his plan was completed and he moved to a new plan, the "Cruciball". As mutants were being revived, Onslaught implanted the idea for a massive party where mutants would then kill each other while a mind-controlled Professor Xavier erased their minds from Cerebro. Onslaught would then eat these minds and grow infinitely stronger. When the "Cruciball" was foiled, Onslaught decided to take matters into his own hands and manifested himself in the physical world. Due to the fact that Magneto has become significantly peaceful and Professor Xavier has embraced his darker side, Onslaught's new form mimics that of Professor X's with a blood-red, Cerebro-like helmet, black bodysuit and jagged claws. He even lords over mutants in much the same way that Xavier has been doing recently. Possessing Magneto and Xavier again soon afterwards, Onslaught renew his attack on the Krakoans. However, even with his powers augmented by his first hosts, this version of Onslaught was, after all, only a sliver of the original powered up by stolen energies, therefore he was no match for Nightcrawler, Legion, and their allies, who worked together to create the Alter, Legion's own mind organized into a functioned pocket universe in the Astral Plane, where mutants could link their minds together. Under Nightcrawler's direction they them embrace Onslaught instead of fighting him which diminished him under the weight of their very human emotional baggage. Nightcrawler then crushes the pathetic creature that Onslaught has been reduced to, apparently ending his threat once and for all.

Powers and abilities
Onslaught is a psionic entity with superior physical and mental power; possessing the combined abilities of both his progenitors Professor X and Magneto. He also later added the powers of Franklin Richards and Nate Grey to his own, making him even more incredibly powerful. At its prime, Onslaught is capable of telepathy, telekinesis, energy projection, sensing mutant presences, manipulating magnetic fields, mind control, flight, mental manipulation, possession, astral projection, perceiving the world around himself as patterns of magnetic and electrical energy, absorbing any mutant into his being and affecting reality itself. Onslaught can also enhance his physical size and strength.

Onslaught's powers were well over that of Omega Level. In his first form (when he was one with Xavier), Onslaught showed a wide variety of abilities including immeasurable strength, and incredible resistance and endurance. Onslaught's psionic powers appeared limitless, appearing to surpass even that of Xavier in his right mind. He was especially powerful in the Astral Plane, where he appeared to have god-like abilities. From what has been seen, he seems to have total mental control over anyone or anything he wishes, ranging from altering people's perception to believe they are someone or somewhere else (he demonstrated this by making Wolverine believe he was a wolf pup, and making Storm think she was a child). Even in his initial form, he also demonstrated sufficient physical strength to punch the Juggernaut unconscious across North America, and to rip the Crimson Gem of Cyttorak out of his body. Onslaught also possessed many forms of energy projection, all of which are at high levels of power.

After fully evolving into his own, separate consciousness and having Professor X ripped from him in the Astral Plane, Onslaught evolved into a second form, less resembling Magneto and looking more like a cybernetic monster. In this form, thanks to adding the full potential of Franklin Richards and Nate Grey combined, his powers were increased to god-like levels, including the ability to mass-manipulate (his complete takeover of all the Sentinels), create and reshape matter at will (shown when he created his citadel, and when he created a second sun to destroy Earth), and an apparent omniscience (as evidenced when he easily thwarted an attempt to sneak into his citadel). He could use his combined reality-warping and telekinetic abilities to boost his physical strength to the point that he was able to go toe-to-toe in a physical fight with the Hulk even after the Hulk's mind had been blanked and his strength and rage set to incredible levels thanks to Jean Grey 'shutting down' the subconscious influence that Bruce Banner normally exerted over the Hulk to stop him going too far.

For a time, Onslaught had these powers while still in his first form; the majority of these came from the absorption of Nate Grey and Franklin Richards. In the end, Onslaught's true body was revealed to be a mass of pure, psionic energy that was immune to all forms of physical attacks.

Other versions

Ultimate Marvel
In the Ultimate Marvel reality, Onslaught is alluded to in Professor X's return sporting futuristic armor. Xavier was seemingly killed by the time traveling mutant "Cable", however, Cable did not actually kill Xavier, but transported his unconscious body with him back to the future to keep under mental block until his questions could be answered. He healed Xavier's spine and replaced his legs and prepared him for the coming of Apocalypse, led by his avatar Sinister. 

Xavier tried fighting Apocalypse and failed. He was barely saved when Jean merged with the Phoenix God and defeated the powerful mutant. But she pointed out to Xavier that because of him, he set the mutant cause back by a hundred years. She expected him to start over, and reversed time to the point where the attack never happened. Xavier later went to Muir Island to recuperate with Moira MacTaggert.

X-Men '92
During the battle against the Shadow King (who was possessing Cassandra Nova) as part of the Secret Wars storyline, Professor X faced Shadow King on the Astral Plane in the form of Onslaught.

In other media

Video games

 Onslaught is a boss character in Marvel vs. Capcom: Clash of Super Heroes, voiced by Maurice Dean Wint. In this game, he appears as the final boss, and he has two forms the player must defeat: the first form which is that of a normal-sized character, and the second and final form which is that of a floating giant. Upon defeat, he is revealed to be Charles Xavier.
 Onslaught appears as a villain character in Marvel Super Hero Squad Online, voiced by Travis Willingham.
 Red Onslaught is a raid boss in the MMO Marvel Heroes.
 Onslaught is a recruitable, unlockable and playable character in the match 3 RPG game Marvel Puzzle Quest.
 Onslaught also appears in Marvel SNAP, a 6 cost card that has the Ongoing effect of doubling your other Ongoing effects at the card's location.

Collected editions

References

External links
 Onslaught at Marvel.com
 In-depth analysis on the creation of Onslaught
 Article on the Onslaught crossover

Characters created by Mark Waid
Characters created by Scott Lobdell
Characters created by Andy Kubert
Comics characters introduced in 1996
Fictional anthropomorphic characters
Fictional characters who can change size
Fictional characters who can manipulate reality
Fictional characters with absorption or parasitic abilities
Fictional characters with metal abilities
Fictional characters with electric or magnetic abilities
Fictional characters with elemental transmutation abilities
Fictional characters with energy-manipulation abilities
Fictional characters with superhuman senses
Fictional characters with spirit possession or body swapping abilities
Fictional characters without a name
Fictional empaths
Marvel Comics characters who are shapeshifters
Marvel Comics characters who have mental powers
Marvel Comics characters with superhuman strength
Marvel Comics giants
Marvel Comics mutants
Marvel Comics supervillains
Marvel Comics male supervillains
Marvel Comics telekinetics
Marvel Comics telepaths